Alison Singer is the president of the Autism Science Foundation (ASF).  She has also served on the IACC.  She was formerly an executive vice president of Autism Speaks and as a vice president at NBC.

Research and advocacy

Singer started the Autism Science Foundation after resigning from Autism Speaks in 2009, due to her view that it should not spend money on studying the scientifically discredited link between MMR vaccine and autism.  She discourages their portrayal of a false balance on this issue.  Singer has been described as a strong candidate for combating the perception of a link between autism and vaccines.  At Autism Speaks, she was in a far more influential position, and helped the organization become well-known.

She developed the C.A.S.E. approach as a means for clinicians to address vaccine hesitancy immediately and during the clinical encounter in which the hesitancy is raised. C.A.S.E. stands for Corroborate, About Me, Science, and Explain/Advise. With the C.A.S.E. approach, the clinician frames a response to the vaccine hesitant patient that corroborates awareness of the patient's hesitancy while identifying a shared underlying value or concern. Next, the clinician makes an about me statement, describing how the clinician went about getting a scientific answer to the concern. The clinician then summarizes the science underlying the recommendation and/or explanation addressing said concerns. Finally, the clinician explains the clinician's advice to the patient. The CASE approach then might only consist of four sentences altogether, but it connects the patient to the clinician through the shared value or concern (corroborate), recognizes and employs the professional standing of the clinician (about me), relies on science to address the concern (science), and allows the clinician to reframe the recommendation addressing the concern of the patient (explain/advise).

She was profiled by the Harvard Business School in an alumni profile, commending her on building a "pipeline of scientists" to research autism.  She claims that HBS gave her the skills needed to run the ASF nonprofit.

Singer was inspired to fund autism research based on the negative experiences of her brother with autism who was institutionalized, and taking care of a severely autistic daughter. Her daughter works with Applied Behavior Analysis therapists, and needs constant care.

Singer also serves on the board of the Marcus Autism Center at Emory, the Yale Child Study Center, the executive board of the Seaver Autism Center at the Icahn School of Medicine and the executive board of the Autism Research Center at the University of North Carolina at Chapel Hill.  She will receive an honorary degree from Emory University in May 2020.

Views on autism and neurodiversity
Singer claims that she supports some of the goals of autism advocates, but still advocates for medical research on autism.  She says that neurodiversity often takes away funds from severely autistic individuals.  Singer has also advocated for more media awareness of severe autism.

Autism Every Day controversy

Autism Speaks sponsored and distributes the short film Autism Every Day, produced by Lauren Thierry and Eric Solomon.  Alison Singer, who was in the film, was reportedly criticized for a scene in which she said that when faced with having to place the girl in a school that she deemed to be terrible, she contemplated driving her car off a bridge with her child in the car.  She additionally expressed this view in the presence of her autistic daughter. Thierry said that these feelings were not unusual among non-autistic mothers of autistic children. According to the book Battleground: The Media, Thierry instructed the families she interviewed not to do their hair, vacuum or have therapists present, and appeared with her film at homes crew without preliminary preparations, in order to authentically capture the difficulties of life with autistic children, such as autistic children throwing tantrums or physically struggling with parents.

In 2009, Singer responded by claiming that she made this comment because the New York State Department of Health recommended that her autistic daughter be placed in a school with very poor conditions, and did not want her daughter to suffer there.  However, she regretted phrasing her concerns in that manner.  Singer also claimed that she reconciled with autism advocates to some extent, but still advocates for medical research on autism.

References

External links
Autism Science Foundation
Harvard Business School Alumni Profile

1966 births
Living people
Yale University alumni
Harvard Business School alumni
Critics of alternative medicine
NBC executives
Women television executives